Congregation Tifereth Israel Synagogue is a historic synagogue at 519 Fourth Street in Greenport, Suffolk County, New York.  It is an irregular shaped building that consists of the original 1903 portion and a large addition to the rear (c. 1920 and 2000).  It is a -story structure with a front-gabled roof and a 1-story projecting entrance with a low-pitched, front-gabled roof.

It was added to the National Register of Historic Places in 2006.

References

Synagogues in Suffolk County, New York
Sag Harbor, New York
National Register of Historic Places in Suffolk County, New York
Synagogues on the National Register of Historic Places in New York (state)
Synagogues completed in  1903
1903 establishments in New York (state)